Michael J. Timmons is an American school administrator and politician.

Prior to his political career, Timmons was a high school principal. He became president of the Cumberland Fair in 2006. Timmons contested Steve Moriarty's open seat on the Maine House of Representatives in 2014, defeating Dale Denno. He lost a 2016 reelection bid to Denno. Paul LePage considered Timmons for a position on the board of Lands for Maine's Future in 2017, which Timmons declined.

References

1940s births
American school principals
Republican Party members of the Maine House of Representatives
21st-century American politicians
People from Cumberland, Maine
Living people